John Mahler (born November 16, 1936, Alpha, Iowa), is a former open wheel race car driver in the USAC and CART Championship Car series.  He raced in the 1970-1973 and 1976-1981 seasons, with 39 combined career starts, including the 1972 and 1977-1979 Indianapolis 500.  He finished in the top ten 6 times, with his best finish in 6th position in 1970 at the Indianapolis Raceway Park road course.

Mahler qualified for the 1971 Indianapolis 500 but was replaced by his teammate who did not qualify, Dick Simon, due to sponsorship commitments. Mahler was presented with the American Auto Racing Writers and Broadcasters Association Jigger Award for the driver with the most hard luck.  He was a member of the 1977 and 1979 Last Row Party for earning a position in the 11th and final row of the starting grid.

Mahler currently owns and operates Classic Concrete Designs in Kansas City, Missouri.

Complete motorsports results

American Open-Wheel racing results
(key) (Races in bold indicate pole position, races in italics indicate fastest race lap)

SCCA National Championship Runoffs

Indianapolis 500 results

External links
Driver Database Profile

1936 births
Mahlar, John
Living people
Indianapolis 500 drivers
People from Fayette County, Iowa
Racing drivers from Iowa
SCCA National Championship Runoffs participants